The B recognition element (BRE) is a DNA sequence found in the promoter region of most genes in eukaryotes and Archaea.  The BRE is a cis-regulatory element that is found immediately near TATA box, and consists of 7 nucleotides. There are two sets of BREs: one (BREu) found immediately upstream of the TATA box, with the consensus SSRCGCC; the other (BREd) found around 7 nucleotides downstream, with the consensus RTDKKKK.

The BREu was discovered in 1998 by Richard Ebright and co-workers. The BREd was named in 2005 by Deng and Roberts; such a downstream recognition was reported earlier in 2000 in Tsai and Sigler's crystal structure.

Binding
The transcription factor II B (TFIIB) recognizes either BRE and binds to it. Both BREs work in conjunction with the TATA box (and TATA box binding protein), and have various effects on levels of transcription.

TFIIB uses the cyclin-like repeats to recognize DNA. The C-terminal alpha helices of TFIIB intercalate with the major groove of the DNA at the BREu. The N-terminal helices bind to the minor groove at BREd. TFIIB is one part of the preinitiation complex that helps RNA polymerase II bind to the DNA.

In addition to the human TFIIB-BRE structure, structures from many other organisms have been solved. Among those are transcription factor B (TFB) from the archaeon Pyrococcus woesei which presents an inverted orientation and a TFIIB from the parasite Trypanosoma brucei which despite some specific insertions show a similar fold.

See also
 CAAT box
 Enhancer (genetics)
 Initiator element
 Insulator (genetics)
 Promoter (biology)
 Transcription start site

Notes

References

Regulatory sequences